10th & Wolf is a 2006 film about the Philadelphia Mafia directed by Robert Moresco.  It is based on a true story of a mob war in South Philadelphia.  The film stars James Marsden, Giovanni Ribisi and Brad Renfro and features appearances by Dennis Hopper, Val Kilmer, Piper Perabo, Lesley Ann Warren, Tommy Lee, 1980s Italian comedian, singer, actor and director Francesco Salvi and Brian Dennehy.

The film was billed as based on a story by "Donnie Brasco", the undercover name of FBI agent Joseph Pistone, who successfully infiltrated the Mafia, as portrayed in the movie of the same name starring Johnny Depp and Al Pacino.

While the film is set in Philadelphia, it was filmed in Pittsburgh, with scenes at Tom's Diner and Bloom Cigar Company in the South Side and Hartwood Mansion.

Synopsis
Tommy is the son of a Mafia hitman, who, after his father is killed by a rival, moves with his younger brother to live with his aunt, uncle and cousin in Philadelphia. The sole member of his family who is not involved in crime, Tommy joins the Marines and fights in Operation Desert Storm. Becoming disillusioned when the conflict ended with Saddam Hussein still in power.  and disenchanted with military service, Tommy assaults an MP, and steals a colonel's Jeep. Arrested when the jeep runs out of gas, the movie opens with Tommy in the brig at a US Marine base.

An FBI agent (played by Dennehy) coerces Tommy into infiltrating the family business. The agent tells Tommy that he can protect his brother and cousin in return for evidence against the Sicilian mob trying to take over the heroin trade in the US. Tommy is instructed to wear a wire to record negotiations between his cousin and gang leader, Joey Marcucci and Mafia boss Luciano Reggio.

Tommy tries to get incriminating evidence against Reggio, while protecting his cousin and younger brother in their fledgling attempts to become "goodfellas". His efforts to strike a balance between his family loyalties, and the FBI's need for evidence, take up most of the film's bulk.

Cast
 James Marsden as Tommy
 Giovanni Ribisi as Joey Merlino
 Brad Renfro as Vincent
 Piper Perabo as Brandy
 Dennis Hopper as Matty Matello
 Brian Dennehy as FBI Agent Horvath
 Lesley Ann Warren as Tina
 Leo Rossi as FBI Agent Thornton
 Dash Mihok as Junior
 Tommy Lee as Jimmy "Tattoo"
 Francesco Salvi as Luciano Reggio 
John Stanfa
 Val Kilmer as Murtha
 John Capodice as Sipio
 James Grimaldi as Ricky Jerkoff

Reception
The film was panned by critics. It holds a 19% approval score on Rotten Tomatoes, with an average rating of 4/10, based on 27 reviews. Metacritic assigned the film a weighted average score of 36 out of 100, based on 10 critics, indicating "generally unfavorable reviews".

Accolades

Home media
The film was released in DVD on July 9, 2007.

References

External links

 

 
 

2006 films
2000s crime films
American crime films
2000s English-language films
Films about the American Mafia
Films scored by Aaron Zigman
Films set in Philadelphia
Films shot in Pittsburgh
Films set in the 1990s
Philadelphia crime family
Films directed by Robert Moresco
2000s American films
English-language crime films